Alpheos or Alpheus may refer to:

 Alpheus (mythology), a river god in Greek mythology
 Alpheus, West Virginia, a community in the US
 Alfeios River, the Greek river which the mythological god refers to
 Alphaeus, a father of two of the Twelve Apostles in the New Testament
 Alpheus Mytilenaeus, an ancient Greek poet
 Alpheus (crustacean), a genus of shrimps

See also
 Alphaeus (disambiguation)